Chelsea Records was an American-based record company founded by musician, songwriter, and record producer Wes Farrell in 1972. Within the company's first four months, it released its first gold single, Daddy Don't You Walk So Fast by Wayne Newton.
In addition to Newton, Chelsea featured a number of new and established artists like Tommy Boyce, Jim Gilstrap, Lulu, Jigsaw, New York City, and Rick Springfield.

A sublabel, Roxbury Records, focused on the soul and R&B market and scored a million-selling hit with William DeVaughn's Be Thankful for What You Got in 1974.

RCA Records originally handled distribution for Chelsea, but Farrell switched to independent distributors in 1974, 
and later did its own distribution. 
Ultimately, RCA absorbed the label in 1977. In 2018, Boston Rapper MC Spice The Legend formed a new record label named Roxbury Records(no relation to the former label, which folded in 1977). MC Spice The Legend released his album "Grown Folk Hiphop" on Roxbury Records and distributed it through PayUp Records and Empire Distribution.

References 

 
Defunct record labels of the United States
Record labels established in 1972
Record labels disestablished in 1977